Di Bonaventura Pictures (also known as dB Pictures) is an American film and television production company founded in 2002 by Lorenzo di Bonaventura, who is known for producing the Transformers films.

History 
On September 3, 2002, Lorenzo di Bonaventura announced that he would leave Warner Bros. to set up his own production company, and that it had a deal with Warner Bros. to produce the feature film Constantine, which was released in 2005.

On December 17, 2002, three months after the company was formed, it signed a 3-year contract with Paramount Pictures to produce feature films.

Di Bonaventura Pictures has remained at Paramount, signing a series of three-year deals, where it has produced the Transformers franchise.

Di Bonaventura Pictures Television 
In June 2011, Di Bonaventura, with Dan McDermott, launched a television division, Di Bonaventura Pictures Television, based at ABC Studios under a three-year deal.

When its contract with ABC Studios was not renewed in 2014, it signed a deal with Legendary Television to produce its TV shows.

Filmography

Theatrical films

2000s

2010s

2020s

Upcoming

Television

Digital/direct-to-video titles

References 

Film production companies of the United States
Television production companies of the United States

Entertainment companies based in California
Companies based in Los Angeles
Entertainment companies established in 2002
2002 establishments in California
2002 establishments in the United States
Companies established in 2002